Philaeus is a genus of jumping spiders that was first described by Tamerlan Thorell in 1869. Philaeus maoniuensis was moved to genus Yllenus in 2003.

Species
 it contains seven species with a wide distribution. Most species are from the Mediterranean and West Africa, but single species are known from Guatemala and the Galapagos Islands:
Philaeus chrysops (Poda, 1761) (type) – Europe, North Africa to Middle East, Turkey, Caucasus, Russia (Europe to Far East), Iran, Central Asia, Afghanistan, China, Mongolia, Korea
Philaeus corrugatulus Strand, 1917 – Algeria
Philaeus daoxianensis Peng, Gong & Kim, 2000 – China
Philaeus fallax (Lucas, 1846) – Algeria
Philaeus raribarbis Denis, 1955 – Morocco
Philaeus ruber Peckham & Peckham, 1885 – Guatemala
Philaeus steudeli Strand, 1906 – West Africa

References

External links
 Photograph of P. chrysops

Salticidae genera
Salticidae
Spiders of Africa
Spiders of Asia
Spiders of Central America
Taxa named by Tamerlan Thorell